Rusk Holm is a small island in the Orkney Islands, near Faray to the west.

History
There is a prehistoric cairn on it
.

Rusk Holm is also home to "Holmie Sheep", which are similar to the North Ronaldsay sheep.

Geography and geology
Corn Holm is made up of red sandstone.

It is in Rapness Sound.

References

Uninhabited islands of Orkney